This is a list of arteries of the human body.

 The aorta
 The arteries of the head and neck
 The common carotid artery
 The external carotid artery
 The triangles of the neck
 The internal carotid artery
 The arteries of the brain
 The arteries of the upper extremity
 The subclavian artery
 The axilla
 The axillary artery
 The brachial artery
 The radial artery
 The ulnar artery
 The arteries of the trunk
 The descending aorta
 The thoracic aorta
 The abdominal aorta
 The common iliac arteries
 The hypogastric artery
 The external iliac artery
 The arteries of the lower extremity
 The femoral artery
 The popliteal artery
 The anterior tibial artery
 The arteria dorsalis pedis
 The posterior tibial artery

position of artery 

 
Arteries